Protiviti Inc. (Protiviti) is a global consulting firm headquartered in Menlo Park and San Ramon, California, that provides consulting in internal audit, risk and compliance, technology, business processes, data analytics and finance. It is a subsidiary under Robert Half. Protiviti and its independently and locally owned Member Firms serve clients through a network of more than 85 locations in over 27 countries.

Protiviti was formed in 2002 when the Company hired more than 700 professionals who had been affiliated with the internal audit, business and technology risk consulting practice of Arthur Andersen, including more than 50 individuals who had been partners of that firm. These professionals formed the base of Protiviti. 

Protiviti has served more than 80 percent of Fortune 100, nearly 80 percent of Fortune 500 and 70 percent of Fortune 1000 companies. From 2018 to 2022, the firm has been consistently listed by Forbes⁣ as being one of the world's best management consulting firms. Protiviti has also been listed as one of the 100 Best Companies to Work For by Fortune Magazine for 8 consecutive years from 2015 to 2022.

History
In 2006, Protiviti acquired the assets of PG Lewis & Associates, a leading national provider of Data Forensics and Cybersecurity services founded in 2003 by serial technology entrepreneur, Paul G. Lewis. Financial terms were not disclosed.

In January 2019, Protiviti expanded its Middle East & North African presence by launching an office in Cairo, Egypt. The new location is the first Member Firm in North Africa, and is led by Managing Director Ashraf Fahmy, a former Deloitte partner in Egypt and with the firm's enterprise risk practice in Abu Dhabi.

In February 2019, Protiviti added Gauteng-based internal audit and forensic services firm SekelaXabiso CA (SkX) as its first member firm in South Africa. The new firm will serve domestic firms as well as international firms looking for support to enter the South African market. The firm houses over 200 consultants, and has offices in the major financial centres of Gauteng and Durban.

For fiscal year 2019, Protiviti's revenue exceeded US$1 billion for the first time in its 18-year history.

In March 2020, Protiviti expanded its European footprint by opening 3 new offices in Zurich, Switzerland, and Berlin and Düsseldorf, Germany. Protiviti's global network of member firms operate as independently owned and operated entities, but have access to the firm's resources despite not possessing agency to act on Protiviti's behalf.

Service Expansion
In March 2022, Protiviti formed a new service line, "Protiviti Digital", which serves as a digital marketing agency. Protiviti Digital serves clients seeking to execute complex digital and marketing strategies, as well as transform customer experiences.

In April 2022, Robert Half moved its legal consulting service line to Protiviti, which allows Protiviti to expand its legal consulting practice. The service line supports clients with a broader range of legal, compliance, governance, technology, investigation and transaction-related business needs.

See also
 List of management consulting firms
 List of IT consulting firms
 Robert Half
 Arthur Andersen

References

Corporate subsidiaries
Companies based in Menlo Park, California
Management consulting firms of the United States
International management consulting firms
Risk management companies
International information technology consulting firms
Information technology consulting firms of the United States
Financial services companies established in 2002
Consulting firms established in 2002
Internal audit
2002 establishments in California